The 2019–20 Copa de la Reina was the 35th edition of the Copa de la Reina, Spain's annual field hockey cup competition for women. It was held from 20 to 22 December 2020 in Madrid, at Club de Campo.

Club de Campo won the tournament for the 17th time, defeating Sanse Complutense 4–2 in the final. UD Taburiente finished in third place after defeating Atlètic Terrassa 1–0.

Qualified teams
The tournament was contested by the top eight ranked teams from the first half of the 2019–20 season of the Liga Iberdrola.

Atlètic Terrassa
CD Terrassa
Club de Campo
Club Egara
Júnior
Real Club de Polo
Sanse Complutense
UD Taburiente

Officials
The following umpires were appointed by the RFEH to officiate the tournament:

Sandra Adell (ESP)
Gema Calderón (ESP)
Pilar López (ESP)
María Mercedes Romero (ESP)
Jorge Ocaña (ESP)
Nayra Rodríguez (ESP)
Montserrat Solórzano (ESP)
Laura Trujillo (ESP)

Results

Knockouts

Quarterfinals

First to fourth place classification

Semi-finals

Third and fourth place

Final

Awards

References

External links
Real Federación Española de Hockey

field hockey
field hockey
Spain